Ádám Kovács may refer to:

 Ádám Kovács (footballer) (born 1991), Hungarian footballer
 Ádám Kovács (karateka) (born 1981), Hungarian karateka